Hair, curly is a protein that in humans is encoded by the HRM2 gene.

References 

Genes on human chromosome 1